North Lantau Hospital is a public hospital in central Tung Chung, on Hong Kong Lantau Island. It was completed in late 2012 and began services on 24 September 2013. The hospital has a 24-hour accident and emergency service, and various outpatient services including the North Lantau Community Health Centre. This hospital belongs to Kowloon West Cluster of Hospital Authority.

Services
Accident and Emergency Service: It has been providing 24-hour service after 25 September 2014 onward.

Incidents
The hospital was criticised in August 2015 after an elderly man collapsed at the hospital's bus stop. Staff took 20 minutes to transport the man to the hospital, only 30 metres away. Health minister Ko Wing-man said that accident and emergency department staff took some time to gather the necessary resuscitation equipment. Hong Kong Doctors Union president Henry Yeung Chiu-fat said that personnel should have been ready and called the delay "unbelievable".

References

Hospitals in Hong Kong
Tung Chung
Hospital buildings completed in 2012
2013 establishments in Hong Kong